Boudh is a town and a Notified Area Council in Boudh district  in the state of Odisha, India. It is the district headquarters of Boudh district. It is located on the bank of Mahanadi, the largest river of the state of Odisha.

Geography

Demographics
 India census, Baudhgarh had a population of 20,424. Males constitute 52% of the population and females 48%. Baudhgarh has an average literacy rate of 72%, higher than the national average of 59.5%; with 58% of the males and 42% of females literate. 12% of the population is under 6 years of age.

Politics
Current MLA from Boudh Assembly Constituency is Pradip Kumar Amat, also  Speaker in State Legislative Assembly Odisha. He was also the finance minister of Odisha for some period of time after he won 2014 election and then he was changed to speaker now. He was previously also a speaker in 2009–2014. He won the seat in State elections of 2014,2009, 2004 of BJD and also in 2000 as an independent candidate. Previous MLAs from this seat include Sachidananda Dalal of JD who won this seat in 1995 and 1990, Sujit Kumar Padhi of INC in 1985, Himanshu Sekhar Pandhi of INC(I) in 1980, and Natabar Pradhan of JNP in 1977.

Boudh is part of Phulbani (Lok Sabha constituency).

See also
 Baudh State

References

Bibliography
 Bailey, F. G. (1963). Politics and Social Change in Orissa. Berkeley: University of California Press.
 Pasayat, C. (1998), Tribe, Caste and Folkculture, Jaipur/New Delhi: Rawat Publications.
 Pasayat, C. (2003), Glimpses of Tribal and Folkculture, New Delhi: Anmol Pub. Pvt. Ltd.
 Pasayat, C. (2007), Tribe, Caste and Society, New Delhi: Mohit Publications.
 Pasayat, C. (2007), History of Tribal Society and Culture, New Delhi: Zenith Books International.
 Pasayat, C. (2007), Tribal Non-tribal Divide: Myth and Reality, Bhubaneswar.
 Pasayat, C. (2008), Oral Tradition, Society and History, New Delhi: Mohit Publications.
 Pasayat, C. (2008), Paschima Odisara Lokageeta (in Oriya), Bhubaneswar: Folklore Foundation.
 Pasayat, C. and Sudam Naik (2008), Subarnapur Darbari Sahitya (in Oriya), Bhubaneswar: Gyanajuga Publications.
 Parishada, O. S. (1995). Studies in Buddhism. Institute of Orissan Culture.

External links

Cities and towns in Boudh district